Aconodes submontanus is a species of beetle in the family Cerambycidae. It was described by Stephan von Breuning in 1949. It is known from Myanmar.

References

Aconodes
Beetles described in 1949